Anson Kong Ip-sang (born 16 October 1992), also referred to as AK, is a Hong Kong singer, dancer, actor, and a member of the Hong Kong boy group Mirror. Apart from his group activities, Anson Kong has released solo music and starred in television dramas.

Life and career 
Kong was born in Hong Kong on 16 October 1992. He attended SKH Li Ping Secondary School, an Anglican school in Tsuen Wan. Kong auditioned for the Chinese singing competition Super Boy in 2013, at the age of 18. Realising his passion for performing, Kong invested his free time and resources to singing and dancing, eventually winning a contract with a record label. He was sent to Seoul, South Korea to undergo training for a potential debut in a boy group. When his debut was canceled half a year later, Kong returned to Hong Kong to work as a backup dancer. As a dancer, Kong accompanied many Hong Kong singers and made television appearances as an extra, most notably in Barrack O'Karma (2018) as Selena Lee's dancing partner.

In 2018, Kong auditioned for ViuTV's reality talent competition Good Night Show - King Maker and finished fifth place, earning him a spot in the twelve-member boy group Mirror. The group debuted on 3 November 2018 with the single "In a Second" . Kong was appointed as the band's deputy captain.

Kong made his acting debut in television drama Retire to Queen (2019) with a guest appearance in the first episode. He then starred in the martial arts drama Warriors Within (2020), co-starring Stephen Au and Hedwig Tam.

In February 2020, Kong debuted as a solo artist with his first single "Intentional", which peaked at number eight on the 903 Top 20 and number three on the Metro Radio Chart. In August 2020, he dropped his second single "Snail", which was written by his bandmate Ian. The duet version with Ian topped the Chill Club Chart. His third single "Venus Girl" was released 14 October 2020.

His fourth solo single "Black Breath", released in March 2021, peaked at number two on the 903 Top 20 and Metro Radio Chart. A teaser of a collaboration between Kong and Lokman Yeung was first released on Mirror's instagram account, as part of their summer project. The single and music video for "Stage Door" was released 20 August 2021. Kong's sixth single "Three Words" was released on November 8.

Kong hosted the variety show Have a Sweet Gym, which premiered on 22 November 2021.

In 2022 Kong's seventh single "Rebound" was released on March 3.  This song was a collaboration with Mirror member Alton Wong.  Following after, another single "Shinnomaki" (Chinese:  信之卷) was released in May 2022.  Kong's first movie appearance is in Love Suddenly (2022).  Movie was released on November 17 in Hong Kong.  In November 2022, Kong's first drama series as main role, Rope a dope (Chinese: 繩角) was aired in ViuTV.  Kong was starred as Chun Au-Yeung, who becomes a professional boxer.  Kong also wrote the music for one of the theme song, "Differences Between Us" (Chinese: 我們的相差), for this drama series.

On Dec 1st, 2022, Kong arrived in Vancouver, Canada to film the 5th season of the Hong Kong idol reality show "King Maker".  Kong is one of the judges for the North American audition of this show.

In addition, Kong also runs his own YouTube channel with over 100k subscribers.

Filmography

Films

Television dramas

Variety shows

Discography

Singles

As lead artist

Collaborations

Videography

Music Videos

Music Film

Cameo

Awards and achievements

Notes

References

External links 
 
 
 
 
 

1992 births
Living people
King Maker contestants
Mirror (group) members
Hong Kong male film actors
Hong Kong male television actors
Hong Kong television personalities
21st-century Hong Kong male singers
Hong Kong idols